Human Capital is a 2013 Italian film directed by Paolo Virzì. The film is based on the American novel Human Capital by Stephen Amidon.  For her performance in the film, Valeria Bruni Tedeschi was awarded Best Actress at the 2014 Tribeca Film Festival. It was selected as the Italian entry for the Best Foreign Language Film at the 87th Academy Awards, but was not nominated.

Plot summary
The film is set in a town in Brianza and in Milan. On Christmas Eve, a waiter cycling home from working at a prestigious private school gala is hit by a car. The driver flees, leaving the waiter lying in the street badly injured. The waiter is hospitalized and close to death. The next day, two well-known families' lives are connected by the incident.

Filming locations
Even though the story is set in a town in Brianza, most of the urban scenes were filmed in February 2013 in the cities of Varese and Como, in the countryside of Osnago in the Province of Lecco and in Arese for the villa with the swimming pool. The beautiful villa of the Bernaschi Family is located in Fortunago, a medieval village in the Province of Pavia.

Cast
 Fabrizio Bentivoglio: Dino Ossola
 Valeria Bruni Tedeschi: Carla Bernaschi
 Fabrizio Gifuni: Giovanni Bernaschi
 Valeria Golino: Roberta Morelli
 Matilde Gioli: Serena Ossola
 Guglielmo Pinelli: Massimiliano Bernaschi
 Luigi Lo Cascio: Donato Russomanno
 Giovanni Anzaldo (it): Luca
 Gigio Alberti: Giampi
 Bebo Storti: Inspector
 Michael Sart: Jean Louis, Bernaschi's assistant
 Silvia Cohen: Adriana Crosetti
 Gianluca Di Lauro: Fabrizio, the cyclist
 Paolo Pierobon, Luca's uncle

Reception
Human Capital holds an 80% "Certified Fresh" rating and a weighted average of 6.81/10 on Rotten Tomatoes based on 66 reviews, with the consensus being, "Part character study, part socioeconomic fable, Human Capital offers trenchant commentary as well as absorbing drama."

Awards

See also
 List of submissions to the 87th Academy Awards for Best Foreign Language Film
 List of Italian submissions for the Academy Award for Best Foreign Language Film

References

External links

2013 films
Films directed by Paolo Virzì
Italian neo-noir films
2010s Italian-language films